Pyrgos Stadium is a multi-use stadium in Pyrgos, Greece.  It is currently used mostly for football matches and is the home stadium of Paniliakos.  The stadium holds 6,750 and was built in 1978.

The stadium's record attendance is 8,871 from a 1991 match. It was renovated in 2000 with plastic red and white seats added.

References

Football venues in Greece